Joan Ribó Canut (born 17 September 1947) is a Spanish politician and engineer who has been the mayor of Valencia since 13 June 2015. Ribó is member of Coalició Compromís.

Career
Ribó was born on 17 September 1947 in Manresa in the Province of Barcelona. He studied agricultural engineering at the Polytechnic University of Valencia. Ribó later worked as a school teacher and university professor.

Ribó became active in Valencian politics in the 1980s. He was a member of the Corts Valencianes for the United Left between 1995 and 2007. In 2007 he left the party and in 2011 he became politically active again when he joined Coalició Compromís.

After the Valencian council elections of May 2015 he became mayor of Valencia on 13 June 2015, succeeding Rita Barberá of the People's Party in a historic council election.

After the 2019 local elections that took place on 26 May, Ribó won the elections and was elected again mayor of Valencia. It was the first time that Compromís came first in the local elections in the city.

Personal life
In his spare time, Ribó is an avid gardener and cyclist.

References

1947 births
Living people
Coalició Compromís politicians
Mayors of Valencia
Members of the 4th Corts Valencianes
Members of the 5th Corts Valencianes
Members of the 6th Corts Valencianes
People from Manresa
Technical University of Valencia alumni
United Left (Spain) politicians